Antoine Parat was Governor of Plaisance (Placentia), Newfoundland from 1685 to 1690.

See also 

 David Basset
 Governors of Newfoundland
 List of people of Newfoundland and Labrador

External links 
Government House The Governorship of Newfoundland and Labrador
 

Parat, Antonie
Year of death unknown
Year of birth unknown